Norovelomampionona Roberthine Rabetafika is a Malagasy politician. A member of the National Assembly of Madagascar, she was elected as a member of the Isandra Mivoatsa party; she represents the constituency of Isandra.

External links
Profile on National Assembly site

Year of birth missing (living people)
Living people
Members of the National Assembly (Madagascar)
Isandra Mivoatsa politicians
21st-century Malagasy women politicians
21st-century Malagasy politicians